This is a list of notable Koreans or notable people of Korean descent.

In Korean names, the family name is placed first (for example, the family name of "Park Ji-Sung" is "Park"), unless the person has decided to Westernize their name.

Artists

Visual artists

Media artists 
 Paik Nam-June

Dancers 
 Young Soon Moon, prima ballerina
 Sujin Kang
 Hong 10, professional break dancer
 Halla Pai Huhm
 Hee Seo

Filmmakers 

 Ahn Byeong-ki
 Bong Joon-ho
 Hong Sang-soo
 Im Kwon-taek
 Jang Joon-hwan
 Kim Jee-woon
 Kim Ki-duk
 Lee Chang-dong
 Park Chan-wook
 Nelson Shin
 Song Hae-sung
 Yoon Je-kyoon

Poets and authors 

 Baek Minseok
 Baek Seok
 Bang Hyun-seok
 Chae Ho-ki 
 Chan Jeong
 Cheong Chi-yong, poet
 Choi Seung-ho, poet
 Cho Sung-ki, novelist
 Choi Il-nam, novelist
 Choi Soo-cheol
 Chun Woon-young
 Do Jong-hwan, poet
 Gu Hyo-seo
 Ha Geun-chan, author
 Ha Seong-nan, author
 Hailji, author
 Han Bi-ya, travel writer
 Han Chang-hun, author
 Han Kang
 Han Mahlsook, novelist
 Heo Su-gyeong, poet
 Hong Sung-won, author
 Hwang In-suk, poet
 Hwang Ji-u, poet
 Hyun Kil-un
 Jang Eun-jin
 Jang Jeong-il 
 Jang Seok-nam, poet
 Jeon Gyeong-rin
 Jeon Sang-guk
 Jeong Do-sang
 Jung Hansuk
 Jung Ihyun
 Jung Mi-kyung
 Kang Chol-hwan, author of The Aquariums of Pyongyang
 Kang Sok-kyong
 Kang Young-sook 
 Ko Un
 Kim Byeol-ah
 Kim Eon

 Kim Gi-taek
 Kim Gwangrim
 Kim Gyeong-uk
 Kim Haki
 Kim Hu-ran
 Kim Jae-Young
 Kim Jong-gil 
 Kim Ju-yeong
 Kim Kwang-kyu 
 Kim Kyung-ju 
 Kim Mi-wol 
 Kim Sa-in
 Kim Sang-ok 
 Kim Sinyong 
 Kim Seon-wu 
 Kim Seong-dong
 Kim Seung-hee
 Kim Sowol
 Kim Tak-hwan 
 Kim Wonu
 Kim Yeong-hyeon 
 Kim Yong-man
 Kwak Jae-gu 
 Kwon Jeong Saeng
 Kwon Yeo-sun
 Kye Yong-mook
 Lee Eun-sang, poet
 Lee Ho-cheol
 Lee Hye-gyeong (born 1960)
 Lee Hyeonggi (born 1933)
 Lee In-hwa
 Lee Jangwook, author and poet
 Lee Kang-baek, playwright
 Lee Ki-ho, author
 Lee Mankyo
 Lee Mun-ku, author
 Lee Oyoung, author and critic
 Lee Soon-won
 Lee Sungboo, poet and novelist
 Lee Yuksa
 Lee Yun-gi

 Lee Yuntaek, dramatist and poet
 Ma Jonggi (born 1939)
 Moon Chung-hee 
 Moon Taejun 
 Nam Jung-hyun
 Oh Kyu-won (born 1947)
 Oh Sangwon, author
 Oh Soo-yeon, novelist
 Oh Taeseok
 Park Chong-hwa, novelist
 Paik Gahuim
 Park Hee-jin
 Park Hyoung-su
 Park Jaesam (1933–1997)
 Park Jeong-dae 
 Park Mok-wol
 Park Kyung-ni
 Ynhui Park
 Park Sang-ryung
 Park Sangsoon
 Park Taesun
 Park Taewon
 Park Yeonghan
 Park Yong-rae
 Han Yong-un
 Na Huideok
 Seo Jeong-in
 Seo Hajin
 Shin Yong-mok (born 1974)
 Sim Yunkyung
 So Young-en
 Song Gisuk
 Song Giwon
 Song Sokze
 Song Yeong
 Sung Chan-gyeong (1930–2013)
 Yi In-seong
 Yi Kyoung-ja
 Yi Sang
 Yun Dong-ju

Fashion designers 
 Andre Kim
 Richard Chai
 Cho Young Wan
 Laura Kim (Oscar De La Renta) (Monse)

Businesspeople 

 Ahn Cheol-Soo
 Cho Yang-ho
 Choi Tae-won
 Chung Ju-yung
 Chung Mong-hun
 David Chang
 Euh Yoon-dae
 Lee Byung-chul
 Lee Kun-Hee
 Koo In-hwoi
 Shin Kyuk-ho
 Shin Dong-bin
 Sohn Suk-hee
 Chung Ju-yung
 Rim Ji-hoon
 kim Beom-soo

Entertainers

Actors 

 John Cho
 Ken Jeong
 Awkwafina
 Ji Chang-wook
 Kim Nam-gil
 Kim Seon-ho
 Baek Sung-hyun
 Ryu Soo-young
 Seo Kang-joon
 Shin Hyun-joon
 Seo Ji-hoon
 kim Jung-hyun
 Park Seo-joon
 Kim Rae-won
 Go Jun
 Joo Jin-mo
 Sung Dong-il
 Sandra Oh
 Randall Park
 Lee Min-ki
 Go Yoon
 Jang Hyuk
 Jae Suh Park
 Go Soo
 Gong Yoo
 Jang Keun-suk
 Jung Il-woo
 Jung Joon-ho
 Jun Ji-hyun
 Daniel Dae Kim
 Kang Ha-neul
 Kang Ki-young
 Kim Woo Bin
 Ko Seong-il
 Lee Jun-ho
 Lee Byung-hun
 Lee Jin-wook
 Lee Dong-wook
 Lee Min-ho (born 1987)
 Lee Jong-suk
 Kim Yong-gun
 Kim Ji-seok
 Park Bo-gum
 Park Si-hoo
 Song Joong-ki
 Song Hye-kyo
 Philip Ahn
 Shin Ha-kyun
 Ryu Si-won
 Kim Jung-hyun
Jung Woo-sung
kwon Yul
Seo In-guk
Jang Ki-yong
Wi Ha-joon

Comedians

 Fred Armisen
 Bobby Lee
 Ryan Bang
 Won Ho Chung
 Defconn
 H-Eugene
 Margaret Cho
 Haha
 Jee Seok-jin
 Jeong Hyeong-don
 Jeong Jun-ha
 Ken Jeong
 Ji Sang-ryeol
 Kang Ho-dong
 Kim Byung-man

 Kim Jun-ho
 Moon Se-yoon
 Kim GuRa
 Kim Yong-man
 Lee Su-geun
 Lee Yong-jin
 Lee Kyung-kyu
 Park Myeong-su
 Noh Hong-chul
 Park Kyung-lim
 Gil Seong-joon
 Shim Hyung-rae
 Song Sae-byeok
 Yoo Jae-suk

Models 

 Hyoni Kang
 Lee Pa-ni
 Sung Hi Lee
 Ju Ji-hoon

Singers 

 ATEEZ
 Anderson .Paak
 Future
 Red Velvet
 Weki Meki
 P1Harmony
 BTS
 BoA
 Bae Joo-hyun
 Sandara Park
 Ok Taecyeon
 kim Bum-soo
 Yoon Il-sang
 Cho Kyuhyun
 Choi Seung-hyun
 Kevin Moon
 Choi Siwon
 Choi Soo-young
 DJ Koo
 Eunhyuk
 G-Dragon
 Haha
 Heo Ga-yoon
 Hyolyn (Kim Hyo Jung)
 Hyeri
 Hyuna
 IU
 Im Na-yeon
 Im Yoona
 J.Fla
 Joon Park
 JooE
 Jeon Jung-kook
 Jennie Kim
 Jessica Jung
 Jung Dae Hyun
 Jung Eun-ji
 Jung Ho-seok
 Jung Wheein
 Hwasa
 Insooni
 Kang Dae-sung
 Kang Seul-gi
 Karen O
 Kim Heechul
 Kim Taeyeon
 Kim Hyo-yeon
 Kim Jaejoong
 Kim Jisoo
 Kim Ji-woo
 Kim Jong-Dae
 Kim Jun-myeon
 Kim Ye-rim
 Kim Junsu
 Kim Nam-joo
 Kim Nam-joon
 Kim Ryeowook
 Kim Seok-jin
 Kim Tae-hyung
 Kim Yong-sun
 Kwon Yuri
 Lee Donghae
 Lee Hi
 Lee Moon-se
 Lee Seung-hyun
 Lee Sungmin
 Leeteuk
 Luna
 Min Yoon-gi
 Miyeon
 Moon Byul-yi
 Oh Ha-young
 Park Bom
 Park Chan-yeol
 Park Cho-rong
 Park Soo-young
 Park Ji-min
 Park Jimin
 Patti Kim
 Psy
 Rain
 Rosé (singer)
 Sandeul
 Alexandra Christine Schneiderman
 Seo Joo-hyun
 Seo Taiji
 Shindong
 Son Na-eun
 Shon Seung-wan
 Song Jieun
 Song So-hee
 Stray Kids
 Sunny
 Taeyang
 Tiffany
  TXT
 Yesung
 Yoon Bo-mi
 Yoon Doo-joon

Classical musicians 

Chang Han-na
Chang, Sarah
Chung Myung-whun
Chung Kyung-wha
Caroline Fischer
Stefan Jackiw
Jo Su Mi
Hong Hei-kyung
Paik Kun-Woo
Seong-Jin Cho
John Myung

Historical Leaders

Lawyers
 Song Sang-Hyun, President of the International Criminal Court (ICC)

Politicians

 Ban Ki-moon, 8th Secretary-General of the United Nations
 Park Jung-Hee, President, 1963–1979
 Chun Doo-hwan, President, 1980–1988
 Roh Tae-woo, President, 1988–1993
 Kim Young-sam, President, 1993–1998
 Kim Dae-jung, President, 1998–2003
 Roh Moo-hyun, President, 2003–2008
 Lee Myung-bak, President, 2008–2012
 Park Geun Hye, President, 2013–2017
 Moon Jae-in, President, 2017–2022
 kim Boo-kyum
 Cho Tae-yong, Permanent Representative of the Republic of Korea to the United Nations.
 Lee Hoi-chang
 Lee Hun Jai
 Lee Hae-chan
 Hwang Kyo-ahn
 Kim Moo-sung
 Kim Il-Sung, Leader of The Democratic People's Republic of Korea, 1948–1994
 Kim Jong-Il, Supreme Leader of The Democratic People's Republic of Korea, 1994–2011
 Kim Jong-Un, Supreme Leader of The Democratic People's Republic of Korea, 2011–present

Religious leaders

 Angela Warnick Buchdahl (born 1972), American rabbi
 Andrew Kim Taegon (1821–1846), first Korean-born Catholic priest, canonized in 1984
 David Yonggi Cho, founder/pastor of Yoido Full Gospel Church
 Hae Jong Kim, Bishop of the United Methodist Church
 Nicolas Cheong Jin-Suk, Roman Catholic Archbishop of Seoul (1998–present)
 Paul Kim (Anglican bishop), Anglican Primate of Korea and Archbishop of Seoul (2009–present)
 Sun Myung Moon, founder of the Unification Church
 Dora Kim Moon, community organizer in Hawaii

Scholars, Philosopher and Social Activists
 Kim Yong-ok, philosopher
 Ham Seok-heon
 Ko Un
 Lee Yuksa
 Moon Ik-hwan
 Hwang Sok-yong
 Jang Jun-ha
 Kwon Young-ghil
 Roh Hoe-chan
 Jeon Tae-il
 Ha Soo Whang, Korean social worker in Hawaii
 Maria Whang, educator and community organizer in Hawaii

Scientists and Engineers
 Lee Sang-mook, geologist and oceanographer
 Kim Soon-kwon, corn biologist
 Hwang Jun-muk, mathematician of algebraic geometry and differential geometry
 Kim Jeong-han, mathematician
 Benjamin W. Lee, theoretical physicist
 Woo Jang-choon, agricultural scientist and botanist
 Philip Kim, physicist
 Kim Bit-nae-ri, biologist
 Hongkun Park, chemist
 Donhee Ham, electrical engineer
 Joon Yun, radiologist
 Stanley Sukjin Kim, world-renowned ophthalmologist
 Incheol Shin, cancer researcher
 Unha Ban, mathematician
 Chan-Jin Chung, computer scientist
 Chan-Jin Chung, computer scientist
 June Huh, world-renowned mathematician

Athletes 

 Ahn Jung-Hwan, footballer
 Hwang Jun-ho, ice skiing
 Birdie Kim (born Kim Ju-yun), LPGA player and 2005 Women's Open champion
 Im Dong-hyun, archery
 Byung-hyun Kim, former MLB player
 Chan Sung Jung, mixed martial arts
 Cha Bum-Kun, footballer in Bundesliga
 Chan-ho Park, MLB player
 Choo Shin-Soo, MLB player, plays for the Texas Rangers
 Dong Keun Park, legendary Taekwondo Champion of the 1960s
 Ha Seung-Jin, professional basketball player currently playing in the Korean Basketball League
 Hee Seop Choi, former MLB player, currently plays in South Korea's Professional Baseball League
 Hines Ward, American football player for the Pittsburgh Steelers
 Hong Myung-Bo, footballer
 Hong-Man Choi, K-1 professional kick boxer
 In Jin Chi, professional boxer, former WBC world champion
 Jay Dee "B.J." Penn, professional mixed martial artist and Brazilian jiu-jitsu practitioner; first American gold medalist of the World Jiu-Jitsu Championship and former UFC Lightweight and Welterweight Champion
 Jim Paek, pro ice hockey player
 Jong Song-Ok, North Korean; championship of Marathon in 1999
 Joo Se Hyuk, Table tennis, defensive chopper
 Jung Kil Kim, taekwondo champion
 Ki Soo Kim, professional boxer, first Korean world champion (WBA, WBC)
 Kim Yuna, figure skater; 2010 Olympic Gold Medalist
 Lee Chun-Soo, footballer
 Lee Hyung-Taik, tennis player
 Lee Sung-hyun, kickboxer
 Lee Seung-Yeop, NPB baseball player
 Lee Yong-Kyu, baseball player
 Lydia Ko, LPGA player
 Michelle Wie, Korean-American LPGA player
 Mi Hyun Kim, LPGA player
 Moon Dae-Sung, 2004 Olympic Taekwon-Do Gold medalist
 Myung Jae Nam, Hapkido master, founder of Hankido (1938–1999)
 Nam Sung-yong, marathon Runner; 1936 Olympic Bronze Medalist
 Park Ji-Sung, footballer, first ever Korean to win the Premier League and the UEFA Champions League with Manchester United.
 Park Sung-hyun, Olympic medal winner Archery
 Park Tae-hwan, swimmer
 Ryu Hyun-Jin, professional baseball player, currently playing in Toronto Bluejays, MLB
 Se Ri Pak, LPGA player
 Seol Ki-hyeon, footballer
 Sohn Kee-Chung, marathon Runner; 1936 Olympic gold medalist
 Son Heung-min, footballer at Tottenham Hotspur, captain and gold medalist at the 2018 Asian Games.
 Sun-Woo Kim, baseball player
 Lee Sang-hyeok, (Faker) professional e-sports player; mid laner on SKT T1
 Yoo Hyeong-jong, footballer

Korean people from other countries
 Korean people
 List of Goguryeo people
 List of Baekje people
 List of Silla people
 List of Goryeo people
 List of Joseon Dynasty people
 List of Korean Americans
 List of Korean Canadians 
 List of people by nationality

References 

Korea